Ratnapur is a panchayat village in Mehkar Taluka of Buldhana District in Maharashtra State, India. It is located west of the Gondala Dam Reservoir. The nearest train station is in Mehkar.

Notes and references 

Villages in Buldhana district